Backwards is a 2012 American sports romance starring Sarah Megan Thomas and James Van Der Beek. The film is directed by Ben Hickernell and written by Sarah Megan Thomas. It is the first feature film on women's Olympic rowing.

The film was released on September 21 in theaters following the  2012 Summer Olympics which featured rowing events.

Real-life Team USA Olympic rowers Megan Kalmoe, Susan Francia and Caryn Davies, who won the bronze medal at the 2012 Summer Olympics in the quadruple sculls event, attended the film's red carpet movie premiere in New York City.

The film was well received by audiences with iTunes reviewers rating it 4 out of 5 stars. The film was referred to as "a must see for sports enthusiasts." The film was well received in reviews as a feel-good sports drama. Los Angeles Times reviewed the film positively for how it "nicely captures rowing's grace and beauty -- and pain and glory -- against a lovely array of iconic Philadelphia backdrops.... A warm film."

Backwards is rated PG and was awarded the Dove “Family-Approved” Seal.

The film was released in 2020 on iTunes and Amazon.

Plot 

When a fiercely competitive rower fails to make the Olympic team for the second time, she reluctantly takes a coaching job at her former high school. However, adjusting to life off the race course is not easy, when someone else is living your dream. Backwards is a look at the personal sacrifices and complex choices facing competitive Olympic hopefuls.

Cast 
Sarah Megan Thomas as Abigail Brooks
James Van Der Beek as Geoff
Margaret Colin as Mrs. Brooks
Glenn Moreshower as Coach Spriklin
Alexandra Metz as Hannah.

References

External links
 

Rowing films